The Alternative Economic Strategy (AES) is the name of an economic programme proposed by Tony Benn, a dissident member of the British Labour Party, during the 1970s and 1980s.

The Secretary of State for Industry in the Labour government, Tony Benn, wrote a paper for his Department in January 1975, which he described in his diary: "It described Strategy A which is the Government of national unity, the Tory strategy of a pay policy, higher taxes all round and deflation, with Britain staying in the Common Market. Then Strategy B which is the real Labour policy of saving jobs, a vigorous micro-investment programme, import control, control of the banks and insurance companies, control of export, of capital, higher taxation of the rich, and Britain leaving the Common Market".

With Britain in economic crisis in October 1976, Benn put forward the AES in Cabinet with the partial support of Peter Shore. He claimed the two courses open to the government were the monetarist, deflationary course recommended by the Treasury and "the protectionist course which is the one I have consistently recommended for two and a half years...protectionism is a perfectly respectable course of action. It is compatible with our strategy. You withdraw behind walls and reconstruct and re-emerge". Benn further said that both courses were a "siege economy" but the difference is that in the monetarist course "you will have the bankers with you and the British people, the trade unions, outside the citadel storming you; with mine it will be the other way round". However the Cabinet rejected the AES (along with two other proposals) on 1/2 December and accepted the terms for a loan from the International Monetary Fund on 12 December.

Notes

References
Tony Benn, Against the Tide. Diaries 1973-76 (London: Hutchinson, 1989).

Further reading
Sam Aaronovitch, The Road from Thatcherism: The Alternative Economic Strategy (London: Lawrence & Wishart, 1981).
Alan Budd, The Politics of Economic Planning (London: Fontana, 1978).
CSE London Working Group, The Alternative Economic Strategy: A Labour Movement Response to the Economic Crisis (CSE Books, 1980).
Kathleen Burk and Alec Cairncross, Goodbye, Great Britain: The 1976 IMF Crisis (Yale University Press, 1992).

Stuart Holland, The Socialist Challenge (London: Quartet Books, 1975).
Mark Wickham-Jones, Economic Strategy and the Labour Party: Politics and Policy-Making, 1970-83 (London: Palgrave Macmillan, 1996).

External links
Robert Rowthorn, ‘The Politics of the Alternative Economic Strategy’, Marxism Today (January 1981).

History of the Labour Party (UK)
Euroscepticism in the United Kingdom